The 53rd Infantry Division (53-ya Pekhotnaya Diviziya) was an infantry formation of the Russian Imperial Army.

Organization
1st Brigade
209th Infantry Regiment
210th Infantry Regiment
2nd Brigade
211th Infantry Regiment
212th Infantry Regiment
53rd Artillery Brigade

Commanders
1915: S. P. Abakanovich
1915–1917: D. K. Guncadze

Chiefs of Staff

Commanders of the 1st Brigade
1914–1915: I. A. Kholmsen

Artillery Brigade Commanders

References

Infantry divisions of the Russian Empire